Sciophila is a genus of fungus gnats in the family Mycetophilidae. There are at least 50 described species in Sciophila.

Species
 Sciophila acuta Garrett, 1925
 Sciophila adamsi Edwards, 1925
 Sciophila agassis Garrett, 1925
 Sciophila arizonensis Zaitzev, 1982
 Sciophila arnaudi Zaitzev, 1982
 Sciophila bicuspidata Zaitzev, 1982
 Sciophila bifida Garrett, 1925
 Sciophila californiensis Zaitzev, 1982
 Sciophila canadensis Zaitzev, 1982
 Sciophila cliftoni Edwards, 1925
 Sciophila conformis Zaitzev, 1982
 Sciophila cordata Zaitzev, 1982
 Sciophila distincta Garrett, 1925
 Sciophila emarginata Zaitzev, 1982
 Sciophila exserta Zaitzev, 1982
 Sciophila fasciata Say, 1823
 Sciophila fenestella Curtis, 1837
 Sciophila festiva Zaitzev, 1982
 Sciophila fractinervis Edwards, 1940
 Sciophila fridolini Stackelberg, 1943
 Sciophila fuliginosa Holmgren, 1883
 Sciophila fusca Garrett, 1925
 Sciophila gagnei Zaitzev, 1982
 Sciophila garretti Zaitzev
 Sciophila habilis Johannsen, 1910
 Sciophila hebes Johannsen, 1910
 Sciophila hirta Meigen, 1818
 Sciophila impar Johannsen, 1910
 Sciophila incallida Johannsen, 1910
 Sciophila insignis Zaitzev, 1982
 Sciophila insueta Zaitzev, 1982
 Sciophila iowensis Zaitzev, 1982
 Sciophila karelica Zaitzev, 1982
 Sciophila laffooni Zaitzev, 1982
 Sciophila longua Garrett, 1925
 Sciophila minuta Zaitzev, 1982
 Sciophila mississippiensis Khalaf, 1971
 Sciophila modesta Zaitzev, 1982
 Sciophila montana Zaitzev, 1982
 Sciophila neohebes Garrett, 1925
 Sciophila nigronitida Landrock, 1912
 Sciophila nonnisilva Hutson, 1979
 Sciophila notabilis Zaitzev, 1982
 Sciophila novata Johannsen, 1910
 Sciophila ochracea Walker, 1982
 Sciophila pallipes Say, 1824
 Sciophila parahebes Zaitzev, 1982
 Sciophila parva Garrett, 1925
 Sciophila pluridentata Zaitzev, 1982
 Sciophila plurisetosa Edwards, 1982
 Sciophila quadratula (Loew, 1869)
 Sciophila septentrionalis Zaitzev, 1982
 Sciophila setosa Garrett, 1925
 Sciophila severa Johannsen, 1910
 Sciophila sublimbatella Zaitzev, 1982
 Sciophila vakulenkoi Stackelberg, 1943
 Sciophila vockerothi Zaitzev, 1982

References

Further reading

 Arnett, Ross H. (2000). American Insects: A Handbook of the Insects of America North of Mexico. CRC Press.

External links

 Diptera.info
 NCBI Taxonomy Browser, Sciophila

Mycetophilidae